Paul Shrivastava served as Chief Sustainability Officer and Director of the Sustainability Institute at The Pennsylvania State University, until July 1, 2022 (currently on sabbatical leave). In October 2018 he joined as a full member of the Club of Rome. Previously he was the Executive Director of Future Earth, an international sustainability research program. Before that, he was Distinguished Professor and Director of the David O'Brien Centre for Sustainable Enterprise at Concordia University.

Early life and education 
Shrivastava was born in Bhopal, India. He attended the St. Joseph's Convent School in Bhopal. He received a bachelor's degree in Mechanical Engineering from the Maulana Azad National Institute of Technology, Bhopal, a Post Graduate Diploma in Management (MBA) from the Indian Institute of Management Calcutta and a Ph.D. from the University of Pittsburgh.

Academic career
Shrivastava held the Howard I. Scott Chair in Management, a distinguished professorship at Bucknell University, and was Associate Professor of Management at the Stern School of Business, New York University.  He was awarded a Fulbright Program Senior Scholar award to study Japanese corporate environmental management at Kyoto University, Japan. He has also taught at the Helsinki School of Economics, and IIM Shillong.  He is the author of Bhopal: Anatomy of a Crisis (1989), a book that launched the field of organizational crisis management. He founded the Organizations and Natural Environment Division of the Academy of Management (the world's largest academic professional association in Management studies).

He was Distinguished Professor and Director of the David O'Brien Centre for Sustainable Enterprise at Concordia University, Montreal.

In February 2015 Shrivastava was appointed Executive Director of Future Earth, an international research programme for sustainability and global environmental change. He also holds the International Research Chair in Art and Sustainable Enterprise at ICN Business School, Nancy, France.  In these roles he combines scientific and artistic approaches to sustainable development, exemplified in the conference Balance unBalance 2011, and his book Learning from the Financial Crisis (edited with Matt Statler) published by Stanford University Press  He has published 17 books and over 100 articles.

He has served on the editorial boards of several leading management studies journals, on the Board of Trustees of DeSales University, on the Board of the Finance and Sustainability Initiative, Montreal, and as Senior Advisor to the Indian Institute of Management Shillong.

Research emphases 
Shrivastava's major contributions to the field of business management are concepts for understanding strategic industrial and environmental crises and crisis management, corporate strategies for sustainability and sustainable strategic management.  His contributions to management practice include crisis management techniques, environmental and sustainability strategies, and use of the arts for creativity and sustainability programs.

Shrivastava's professional work is rooted in a concern for human-technology-nature relationships.  Having grown up in the small town of Bhopal in Madhya Pradesh in the 1950s and 60s, he was enchanted by the promise of technology to improve the lives of people.  He studied engineering in college and graduated first (gold medal) in his mechanical engineering class.  He received a Post Graduate Diploma in Management at IIM Calcutta and Ph.D. from University of Pittsburgh. The Bhopal disaster (the worst industrial accident in history) revealed the two-headedness of technology, and he turned to examining the risks and crises associated with industrial technologies, leading to systematic studies of crisis management.  The field of crisis management has emerged since then as a vital field of study.  It is concerned with identifying systemic causes and consequences of crises.  It has led to development of crisis management and crisis prevention practices in the areas of industrial disasters, computer disasters, risk management, worker safety, metals mining and oil industries.

He developed "embodied learning" methods wherein concepts are intertwined with physically and emotionally engaging activities to create learning experiences that endure and transform.  His course "Managing with Passion" is an events management course in which students learn by planning, organizing, training for and participating in a real event – a USA Triathlon sanctioned public triathlon race.  Students gain understanding of concepts that are interwoven with physical activities, emotional activities, cognitive exercises and online activities.

An element in Shrivastava's professional work is the creation of new organizations. In 1976, along with six entrepreneurs from Microcomp Pvt. Ltd., and eSocrates, Inc., he helped launch the HCL Enterprise group of computer companies.  He has also created academic organizations such as the ONE Division of the Academy of Management, the David O'Brien Centre for Sustainable Enterprise, the World Business School Council for Sustainable Business and non-profit organizations (Industrial Crisis Institute). He has co-founded two academic journals: Industrial Crisis Quarterly published by Elsevier, and Organization & Environment published by SAGE Publications. He is steering WBSCSB in collaboration with UN-Principles of Responsible Management Education and Global Responsible Leadership Initiative, to create a report on the Next 50 Years of Management Education to be presented at Rio+20 Conference in May 2012.

Shrivastava has been studying corporate sustainability for the past two decades.  Despite the scientific understanding of global climate change, global poverty, and biodiversity decline, global leaders are unable to reach effective international agreements to address these challenges.  He suggests that science alone will not solve the problem of sustainability.  Humans have to find a new way of engaging nature, that allows them to care and preserve it in enduring ways.  Shrivastava is extending the scientific understanding of sustainability to the realm of the arts, which as the repository of human emotions offer a vehicle for creating passionate engagement between humans and nature. This project uses transdisciplinary approaches to science and arts in aesthetic inquiry into sustainability issues.  This collaboration of a dozen researchers in France, Canada, USA and India, has produced results including the Balance unBalance 2011 conference and Montreal Degrowth 2012 conference.

His work has been featured in The Los Angeles Times,  The Philadelphia Inquirer, The Christian Science Monitor, The Globe and Mail, and The Montreal Gazette, and on the MacNeil-Lehrer News Hour

Awards 

 IIM Calcutta Distinguished Alumni Award, 2016.
 AACSB Influential Leader, 2015.
 ONE Founders Award, The Academy of Management, 1998.

Publications 
Partial List of Publications:
 Shrivastava, P., Bhopal: Anatomy of a Crisis, Vol. 2. Paul Chapman Publishing Ltd, London.: 1992.
 Shrivastava, P.,  Strategy Formulation and Implementation.  Cincinnati, OH: Southwestern Publishing Co., 1994.
 Shrivastava, P., A. Huff and J. Dutton (Eds). Advances in Strategic Management, Vol. 10. 1994, Greenwich CT.: JAI Press.
 Shrivastava, P., and C. Stubbart, Advances in Strategic Management, Vol 12 (A & B), (Challenges from Outside the Mainstream, Challenges Within the Mainstream), Greenwich CT: JAI Press, 1995.
 Shrivastava, P., Greening Business:  Profiting the Corporation and the environment.  Cincinnati, OH:  Thomson Executive Press, 1996.
 Shrivastava, P., A. Huff and J. Dutton (Series Eds). Advances in Strategic Management: Organizational Learning and Strategic Management, Vol. 14. 1997, Greenwich CT.: JAI Press.
 Timo Busch and P. Shrivastava, Corporate Strategies for Global Climate Change, Greenleaf Publishers, London, 2011.
 Paul Shrivastava and Matt Statler, Learning from the Global Financial Crisis: Sustainably, Reliably, Creatively.  Stanford University Press, Palo Alto CA, 2011.
 Alfred Marcus, Paul Shrivastava, Sanjay Sharma, and Stefano Pogutz (Eds), Cross Sector Leadership for the Green Economy, Palgrave Macmillan, New York, 2012.
 Shrivastava, P, and O. Ivanova, “Corporate Legitimacy Challenges from the Occupy Wallstreet Movement”, Human Relations, August, 2015.
 Persson, Sybil, and Paul Shrivastava, “Which paradigm for a caring and sustainable HRM? Insights from traditional Chinese thought”, accepted Management Organization Review,  Sept 2015.
 Machalaba, C., Daszak, P. and P. Shrivastava, “Future Earth and EcoHealth: A New Paradigm Toward Global Sustainability and Health”, International Association for Ecology and Health, December 2015.  DOI: 10.1007/s10393-015-1076-6.
 Gerlinde Berger-Walliser, Paul Shrivastava & Adam Sulkowski, Using Proactive Legal Strategies for Corporate Environmental Sustainability, 6 Michigan Journal of Environmental & Administrative Law. 1 (2016). Available at: http://repository.law.umich.edu/mjeal/vol6/iss1/1
 Mark Stafford-Smith, David Griggs, Owen Gaffney, Farooq Ullah, Belinda Reyers, Norichika Kanie, Bjorn Stigson, Paul Shrivastava, Melissa Leach, Deborah O’Connell, “Integration: the key to implementing the Sustainable Development Goals”.  Sustainability Science, July 2016.
 Shrivastava, P, and C. Cucuzella, “The art of regenerative regional development: Echigo Tsumari”. Culture and Dialogue, Sept 2016.
 Anik Bhaduri, Janos Bogardi, Afreen Siddiqi, Holm Voigt, Charles Vörösmarty, Claudia Pahl-Wostl, Stuart E Bunn, Paul Shrivastava, Richard Lawford, Stephen Foster, Hartwig Kremer, Fabrice Renaud, Antje Bruns, Vanesa Rodriguez Osuna, “Achieving Sustainable Development Goals from a Water Perspective”. Frontiers in Environmental Science, section Freshwater Science, September 2016.
 
 
 Shrivastava, P., E. G. Schumacher, D. M. Wasieleski, and M. Tasic, “Aesthetic Rationality for Sustainability Decision-Making: Exploring Cognitive and Emotional Factors of an Aesthetics Process”, the Journal of Applied Behavioral Sciences, March 2017.
 
Shrivastava, P. Mark Stafford-Smith, Karen O’Brien, Laszlo Zsolnai, “Transforming Sustainability Science to Generate Positive Social and Environmental Change Globally”, One Earth, 2, April 24, 2020. 
Link

References

External links 
 International Research Chair in Art and Sustainable Enterprise www.ircase.org

Academic staff of Concordia University
Indian Institute of Management Calcutta alumni
Living people
1951 births
Academic journal editors
American academics of Indian descent